Lisa Mayer (born 2 May 1996) is a German sprinter. She competed in the 200 metres at the 2016 European Athletics Championships, won a gold medal at the 2017 IAAF World Relays and has been the European Champion with the German 4 × 100 metres relay team since 2022.

International competitions

1Did not finish in the final
Abbreviations: h = heat (Q, q), sf = semi-final

Personal bests
Outdoor
100 metres – 11.12 (+1.7 m/s, Mannheim 15 May 2021)
200 metres – 22.64 (+1.7 m/s, Weinheim 27 May 2017)
Indoor
60 metres – 7.12 (Karlsruhe 3 February 2018)
200 metres – 23.30 (Leipzig 28 February 2016)

References

External links
 

1996 births
Living people
German female sprinters
Sportspeople from Giessen
Athletes (track and field) at the 2016 Summer Olympics
Olympic athletes of Germany
European Athletics Championships winners
Olympic female sprinters